Blowfly's Punk Rock Party is the 2006 album by Blowfly and his second release for Jello Biafra's label Alternative Tentacles. On this album numerous classics of the punk rock genre by artists such as the Ramones and the Dead Kennedys are given the trademark Blowfly sex parody treatment, as well as one originally non-punk rock song parodied in punk style and several original songs. Jello Biafra makes a guest appearance on both versions of "R Kelly In Cambodia" as does Raf Classic from the Crumbs on "Should I Fuck This Big Fat Ho?" Six "clean" radio edits are also included.

Track listing
All tracks by Bowker, Chavez, Reid, Sherber

 "Punk Cock is Rock" – 1:48
 "Should I Fuck this Big Fat Ho" ("Should I Stay or Should I Go" by The Clash) – 2:44
 "V.D. Party" ("TV Party" by Black Flag) – 3:38
 "R. Kelly in Cambodia" (ft. Jello Biafra) ("Holiday in Cambodia" by The Dead Kennedys) – 3:17
 "Suck and Fuck Train" ("Love Train" by The O'Jays) – 1:44
 "Stick It Down Your Throat Bitch" ("Hit Me With Your Best Shot" by Pat Benatar) – 1:44
 "I Wanna Fuck Your Dog" ("I Wanna Be Your Dog" by The Stooges) – 3:48
 "Scumbag Fucker" – 3:06
 "I Wanna Be a Sex Toy" ("All This and More" by The Dead Boys) – 2:10
 "I Wanna Be Fellated" ("I Wanna Be Sedated" by The Ramones) – 2:04
 "Suck It" ("Whip It" by Devo) – 1:45
 "Destructo Cock" ("Destructo Rock" by Antiseen) – 1:44
 "Fucked With a Dildo" ("Stuck In the Middle" by Rocket from the Crypt) – 0:56
 "Gotta Keep Her Penetrated" ("Come Out and Play (Gotta Keep 'Em Separated)" by The Offspring) – 2:37
 "Playing with Myself" ("Dancing with Myself" by Billy Idol) – 2:17
 "R. Kelly in Cambodia (Not Guilty, Slight Return)" ("Holiday in Cambodia" by the Dead Kennedys) – 2:41
 "Wild in the Sheets" (ft. Uncle Tom) ("Wild in the Streets" by the Circle Jerks) – 1:34
 "Drenched in Cum"  ("Drenched In Blood" by Turbonegro) – 3:12
 "Punk Rock Party" – 2:02

All Ages Radio Edits:

20. "Should I Lay This Big Fat Ho" – 2:43
21. "R. Kelly in Cambodia" – 3:17
22. "V.D. Party" – 3:38
23. "I Wanna Be Fellated" – 2:04
24. "Playing With Myself" – 2:17
25. "R. Kelly in Cambodia" (Not Guilty, Slight Return) – 4:57

Personnel 

 Santanica Batcakes – Model
 Nikki Belyea – Model
 Jello Biafra – Vocals
 Tom Bowker – Choir, Chorus, Producer
 Heidi Calvert – Photography
 Captain Crabs – Vocals
 Sean Chambers – Choir, Chorus
 Chris Chavez – Choir, Chorus
 Courtney Cruz – Model
 Gidget Gein – Model
 Forrest Gimp – Guitar, Group Member
 Peter Harris – Choir, Chorus
 Pete Humphries – Mastering
 Larry Kay – Mastering
 Amy Pomerant – Vocals, Choir, Chorus
 Raf Classic – Vocals, Choir, Chorus
 David Roman – Choir, Chorus
 Rob Sherber – Choir, Chorus
 Summer Peaches – Model
 Shannon Thier aka "Sheigh Zam!" – Vocals, Choir, Chorus
 Uncle Tom – Vocals, Group Member
 Glenn Vance – Model
 Kunta Whytaye – Bass, Group Member
 Tracy Yauch – Engineer, Mixing

Cover Art
The cover art of Punk Rock Party features cameos by Gidget Gein of Marilyn Manson, fetish model Courtney Cruz, burlesque dancer Summer Peaches, and sideshow performer Miss Satanica.

2006 albums
Punk revival albums
Blowfly (musician) albums
Alternative Tentacles albums
2000s comedy albums